The calliope hummingbird (Selasphorus calliope) is the smallest bird native to the United States and Canada. It has a western breeding range mainly from California to British Columbia, and migrates to the Southwestern United States, Mexico, and Central America for its wintering grounds. It was previously considered the only member of the genus Stellula, but recent evidence suggests placement in the genus Selasphorus. This bird was named after the Greek muse Calliope. The former genus name means "little star".

Description
The calliope is the smallest breeding bird found in Canada and the United States. The only smaller species ever found in the U.S. is the bumblebee hummingbird, an accidental vagrant from Mexico.

Calliope hummingbirds have glossy green on the back and crown with white underparts. The adult male has wine-red streaks on the gorget, green flanks and a dark tail. Females and immatures have a pinkish wash on the flanks, dark streaks on the throat and a dark tail with white tips. The only similar birds are the rufous hummingbird and the Allen's hummingbird, but these birds are larger with more distinct and contrasting rufous markings on tail and flanks, and longer central tail feathers.

Habitat and distribution
The breeding habitat of calliope hummingbird is varied among open shrub habitats and altitudes. Nesting usually occurs at higher altitudes in the Rocky Mountains. Open montane forest, mountain meadows, and willow and alder thickets may variously serve as breeding grounds. During migration and winter, they also occur in chaparral, lowland brushy areas, deserts and semi-desert regions. They nest in western North America from southern British Columbia and Alberta south to Colorado and southern California. During spring and summer, they move, mainly through Arizona and New Mexico and northern Mexico, to winter in southwestern Mexico as well as in Guatemala and Belize.

Behavior

Calliope hummingbirds are a migratory bird, generally leaving their breeding grounds earlier than most birds (although not as early as the rufous hummingbird) to take advantage of the late-summer wildflowers in the mountains of western North America. They are believed to be the smallest-bodied long distance migrant in the world.

These birds feed on nectar from flowers using a long extendable tongue, drink sap from holes created by sapsuckers or catch insects on the wing. While collecting nectar, they also assist in plant pollination. Plants preferred for pollinating include paintbrush, penstemon, columbine, trumpet gilia, and elephant head. They will also occasionally catch and eat small insects and spiders.

Adult males usually arrive on the breeding ground before females, from mid-April to early May. The male claims and vigorously defends a nesting territory in which he will breed with many females. The male takes no part in raising the young and often actually vacates the breeding grounds by the time the young hatch. The female usually builds an open cup nest in a conifer tree under an overhanging branch, though apple and alder trees have also been used. The nest is often built on the base of large pine cones and somewhat resembles a pine cone itself. A nest may be used repeatedly over the course of several years. Two eggs are laid from late May to early July and are incubated for 15 to 16 days. The young are capable of flight about 20 days after hatching.

Humming

The prominent humming sound of a calliope hummingbird  as for all hummingbirds during flight and hovering  derives from its rapid wingbeats while feeding or interacting with other hummingbirds. Humming serves as an audible communication to alert other birds of the arrival of a fellow forager or potential mate. The humming sound derives from aerodynamic forces generated by both the downstrokes and upstrokes of the rapid wingbeats, producing acoustic oscillations and harmonics.

Courtship display and sonation
During courtship, a male calliope hummingbird hovers at accelerated wingbeat frequency up to 95 flaps per second (42% higher than normal hovering),  creating a loud buzzing sound, with throat feathers protruding and facing a female. The male then ascends temporarily to 20 meters and dives at high speed, with the rapid descent causing sonation of wing and tail feathers combined with vocalization, intending to attract attention of the female. Research in a wind tunnel demonstrated that the male courtship display includes
sounds produced by three independent feather or vocal components, each with different acoustic characteristics, thus potentially containing different messages appealing to the female. The tail feathers flutter at high frequency and hit each other to produce the buzzing sound.

Temperature regulation

The high metabolic rate of calliope hummingbirds – especially during rapid forward flight and hovering – produces increased body heat that requires specialized mechanisms of temperature regulation for dissipating heat, which becomes an even greater challenge in hot, humid climates. As the smallest North American hummingbird species, calliopes appear to adapt their relatively higher surface-to-volume ratio to improve convective cooling from air movement by the wings. When air temperatures rise above , thermal gradients driving heat passively by convective dissipation from around the eyes, shoulders, and feet are reduced or eliminated, requiring heat dissipation mainly by evaporation and exhalation.

All hummingbirds dissipate heat partially by exhaled air, and from body structures with thin or no feather covering, such as around the eyes, shoulders, under the wings (patagia), and feet.  While hovering, calliope hummingbirds do not benefit from the heat loss by air convection during forward flight, except for air movement generated by their rapid wing-beat, possibly aiding convective heat loss from the extended feet.

Status

Many species of pollinators, including the calliope hummingbird, have shown decreases in certain populations. Little information is available on the overall issues that are causing these declines but possible threats include habitat loss, increased use of pesticides, and replacement of native plants by non-native plants (although, on the other hand, many hummingbirds benefit from non-native plants in gardens that provide additional food). The restricted wintering range of calliope hummingbirds makes the species more susceptible to natural disasters, diseases, or land use changes that could wipe out significant portions of the population. The calliope hummingbird has not been well studied, leaving much of its life history unknown.

References

External links

Calliope Hummingbird – Stellula calliope USGS Patuxent Bird Identification InfoCenter
Calliope Hummingbird Species Account – Cornell Lab of Ornithology
Calliope Hummingbird (Selasphorus calliope) videos at the Internet Bird Collection
Stamps (with RangeMap)

calliope hummingbird
Native birds of Western Canada
Native birds of the Northwestern United States
Native birds of the Western United States
Birds of the Sierra Nevada (United States)
calliope hummingbird
calliope hummingbird